Dangerous Midge (foaled 4 March 2006) is an American-bred, British-trained thoroughbred racehorse. He is best known for winning the Breeders' Cup Turf in 2010.

Background
Dangerous Midge is a bay horse bred in Kentucky. He was sired by Lion Heart, who finished runner-up to Smarty Jones in the 2004 Kentucky Derby and went on to win the Haskell Invitational Handicap. As a descendant of the broodmare La Troienne, Dangerous Midge is closely related to many notable thoroughbreds including Buckpasser, Go For Gin, Sea Hero, Allez France and Easy Goer. As a yearling he was consigned to the Keeneland sales where he was bought for $120,000 by the bloodstock agent Angela Sykes. He subsequently entered into the ownership of Iraj Parvizi and was sent to England to be trained by Brian Meehan at Manton, Wiltshire.

Racing career

2009: three-year-old season
Unraced as a two-year-old, Dangerous Midge made his first racecourse appearance when finishing unplaced in a maiden race at Sandown Park Racecourse in June 2009. Two weeks later he recorded his first win when taking a ten furlong maiden race at Salisbury Racecourse. In July, Dangerous Midge finished third, carrying 132 pounds in a handicap race at Bath Racecourse. On his final start of the year he produced a strong finish to win a minor stakes event at Doncaster in September.

2010: four-year-old season
Dangerous Midge began his second season in April by winning a handicap at Doncaster by five lengths. He then finished unplaced in handicaps at York Racecourse in May and Royal Ascot in June. In July, he was sent to Haydock to contest the Old Newton Cup. Racing over one and a half miles he took the lead two furlongs from the finish and pulled clear to win by eight lengths. In August, Dangerous Midge was moved up in distance to contest the Ebor Handicap over fourteen furlongs at York, where he finished eighth of the twenty runners behind Dirar. In September, Dangerous Midge was moved up in class to run in the Group Three Arc Trial at Newbury Racecourse. He took the lead in the straight and pulled clear of the field to win by four lengths from the odds-on favourite Rainbow Peak. Following his Newbury win, Dangerous Midge was sent across the Atlantic for the Breeders' Cup Turf at Churchill Downs. Running in his first Grade One race, he started at odds of 5/1 in a field 
of seven. Ridden by Frankie Dettori, he took the lead in the straight and won by one and a quarter lengths from Champ Pegasus.

2011: five-year-old season
Dangerous Midge failed to reproduce his Breeders' Cup form in 2011. He finished unplaced in all four of his starts, finishing last on three occasions. After finishing unplaced in two more races in 2012 Dangerous Midge was retired from racing. He was sold and exported to stand as a stallion in Chile at the Agricola Santa Nadia.

Pedigree

References 

2006 racehorse births
Racehorses trained in the United Kingdom
Racehorses bred in Kentucky
Breeders' Cup Turf winners
Thoroughbred family 1-x